Shipshape & Bristol Fashion is an album released in 1986 by New Zealand band Hello Sailor.

Credits

 Artwork By – Peter Adams
 Backing Vocals – Annie Crummer, Herbs, Jaqui Fitzgerald
 Bass – Lisle Kinney (tracks: A5), Liam Henshall* (tracks: A1 to A4, B1 to B5)
 Drums – Ricky Ball
 Engineer – Paul Streekstra
 Keyboards – Rob Fisher
 Mandolin – Brendan Power
 Percussion – Jimmy Maelin
 Producer – Liam Henshall
 Vocals, Guitar – Dave McArtney, Harry Lyon
 Vocals, Guitar, Harmonica – Graham Brazier

Hello Sailor (band) albums
1986 albums